The 1988 Michigan Wolverines football team was an American football team that represented the University of Michigan as a member of the Big Ten Conference during the 1988 NCAA Division I-A football season. In its 20th season under head coach Bo Schembechler, the team compiled a 9–2–1 record (7–0–1 against conference opponents), won the Big Ten championship, defeated USC in the 1989 Rose Bowl, outscored opponents by a total of 361 to 167, and was ranked No. 4 in the final AP and UPI polls. 

The team's statistical leaders included quarterback Michael Taylor with 957 passing yards, tailback Tony Boles with 1,408 rushing yards, and split end Greg McMurtry with 470 receiving yards, and placekicker Mike Gillette with 97 points scored. 

Two Michigan players received first-team honors on the 1988 All-America college football team: center John Vitale (consensus) and defensive tackle Mark Messner (consensus). Seven Michigan players received first-team honors on the 1988 All-Big Ten Conference football team.

Schedule

Rankings

Game summaries

at Notre Dame

Miami (FL)

Wake Forest

Tony Boles 33 Rush, 213 Yds

Wisconsin

Michigan State

Kicker Mike Gillette scored on a 40-yard fake punt run, a play that was put in during halftime, and kicked a 30-yard field goal as Michigan's defense registered five sacks and an interception against the winless Spartans.

at Iowa

A 17-17 tie at Kinnick Stadium was the lone blemish on an otherwise perfect Big Ten season for the Wolverines.

Indiana

Northwestern

Minnesota

Illinois

Ohio State

vs. USC (Rose Bowl)

Players

Offense
Tony Boles – started 10 games at tailback (team's leading rusher in 1988 with 1,408 yards)
Demetrius Brown – started 3 games at quarterback (48 of 84 for 775 passing yards)
Jeffrey Brown – started 11 games at tight end
Jarrod Bunch – started 5 games at fullback
Chris Calloway – started 5 games at flanker and 1 game at split end (led team with 4 touchdown catches)
Dave Chester – started 2 games at left guard
Dean Dingman – started 12 games at right guard
Tom Dohring – started 10 games at left tackle
Leroy Hoard – started 6 games at fullback and 1 game at tailback (team's second leading rusher in 1988 with 752 yards)
Chris Horn – started 1 game at fullback
Mike Husar – started 10 games at left guard and 2 games at left tackle
John Kolesar – started 7 games at flanker (team's second leading receiver with 18 catches for 356 yards)
Greg McMurtry – started 10 games at split end (team's leading receiver with 27 catches for 470 yards)
Greg Skrepenak – started 12 games at right tackle
Michael Taylor – started 9 games at quarterback (65 for 122 for 957 passing yards)
John Vitale – started 12 games at center
Derrick Walker – started 1 game at tight end and 1 game at split end
Tracy Williams – started 1 game at tailback

Defense
Bobby Abrams – started 12 games at outside linebacker
Erick Anderson – started 6 games at inside linebacker (led team with 77 tackles)
David Arnold – started 10 games at cornerback
Mike Evans – started 1 game at defensive tackle
J. J. Grant – started 9 games at inside linebacker (tied for second on the team with 72 tackles)
Mark Gutzwiller, defensive back
John Hermann – started 2 games at defensive tackle
David Key – started 12 games at cornerback (fifth on the team with 63 tackles)
Alex Marshall – started 9 games at outside linebacker
Mark Messner – started 12 games at defensive tackle (fourth on the team with 70 tackles)
Anthony Mitchell – started 1 game at outside linebacker
Vada Murray – started 12 games at free safety (second on team with 4 interceptions)
T. J. Osman – started 12 games at middle guard
Todd Plate – started 2 games at cornerback
Marc Spencer – started 3 games at inside linebacker
Tripp Welborne – started 12 games at strong safety (led team with five interceptions; tied for second on the team with 72 tackles)
Brent White – started 9 games at defensive tackle
Tim Williams – started 2 games at outside linebacker

Special teams
Tony Boles – kick off returns (14 returns for an average of 24.1 yards)
Mike Gillette – placekicker (18 of 27 on field goals) and punter (46 punts for an average of 39.9 yards)
Gulam Khan – placekicker (0 for 1 on field goals)
John Kolesar – kickoff returns (13 returns for an average of 23.5 yards); punt returns (17 returns for an average of 11.9 yards)

Awards and honors
All-Americans: Mark Messner, John Vitale
All-Conference: Mark Messner, John Vitale, Mike Husar, John Kolesar, Tony Boles, Mike Gillette, David Arnold
Most Valuable Player: Mark Messner
Meyer Morton Award: John Vitale
John Maulbetsch Award: Tripp Welborne
Frederick Matthei Award: Warde Manuel
Arthur Robinson Scholarship Award: David Weil
Dick Katcher Award: Mark Messner
Hugh Rader Jr. Award: Mark Messner
Robert P. Ufer Award: John Kolesar

Coaching staff
Head coach: Bo Schembechler
Assistant coaches: Tirrel Burton, Cam Cameron, Lloyd Carr, Jerry Hanlon, Bill Harris, Jim Herrmann, Les Miles, Gary Moeller, Bobby Morrison, Tom Reed
Trainer: Russ Miller
Manager: Pat Perkins, Scott Boyle

References

External links
  1988 Football Team -- Bentley Historical Library, University of Michigan Athletics History

Michigan
Michigan Wolverines football seasons
Big Ten Conference football champion seasons
Rose Bowl champion seasons
Michigan Wolverines football